The Comfortable Chair is a West Coast musical group that released one self-titled album, The Comfortable Chair, in 1968.

Name
The name of the band refers to sitting in a comfortable chair while meditating. Several members were involved with Maaharishi’s Transcendental Meditation program.

Members

History
The group was never big outside of the 1960s California circuit. The album features original songs written collectively by the band. Lou Adler produced the album, along with John Densmore and Robby Krieger of The Doors. The record was released on CBS-Ode Records in 1968.

Songs on the album include: "Ain't No Good No More"; "Be Me”; "Now", written by Barbara Baczek-Wallace; "Let Me Through", by Keith Wallace and Barbara Baczek- "Princess", "The Beast", and "Some Soon, Some Day", written by Bernie Schwartz; "Pale, Night of Quiet", written by Schwartz and Tad Baczek; "The Stars in Heaven" by Garfin, Schwartz, Wallace, Baczek.

The group appeared in the 1968 Bob Hope and Jackie Gleason comedy movie How to Commit Marriage as a rock group associated with the young people in the plot, performing their protest song "A Child's Garden".

External links
Official website from the Wayback Machine; domain has expired.
Further information on the band

Musical groups established in 1968
Musical groups disestablished in 1971
Ode Records artists
Psychedelic rock music groups from California